In enzymology, a pyridoxine 4-oxidase is an enzyme that catalyzes the chemical reaction

pyridoxine + O2  pyridoxal + H2O2

Thus, the two substrates of this enzyme are pyridoxine and O2, whereas its two products are pyridoxal and H2O2.

This enzyme belongs to the family of oxidoreductases, specifically those acting on the CH-OH group of donor with oxygen as acceptor.  The systematic name of this enzyme class is pyridoxine:oxygen 4-oxidoreductase. Other names in common use include pyridoxin 4-oxidase, and pyridoxol 4-oxidase.  This enzyme participates in vitamin B6 metabolism.  It employs one cofactor, FAD.

References

 

EC 1.1.3
Flavoproteins
Enzymes of unknown structure